Charles Lane may refer to:

Actors
Charles Lane (actor, born 1869) (1869–1945), American silent film character performer
Charles Lane (actor, born 1905) (1905–2007), American centenarian character performer
Charles Lane (filmmaker) (born 1953), African-American actor, director and writer

Writers
Charles Lane (transcendentalist) (1800–1870), American philosopher, co-founder of Fruitlands
Charles Henry Lane (before 1850—after 1918), aka C. H. Lane, British author who researched domestic animals such as the Manx cat
Charles Daniel Lane (born 1948), English molecular biologist
Charles Lane (journalist) (born 1961), American reporter for The Washington Post

Others
Charles A. Lane (1825–1906), American Republican legislator in Wisconsin
Charles D. Lane (1840–1911), American mine owner who founded Nome, Alaska
Charles Lane (athlete) (1905–1954), Australian Olympic sprinter